Frank Hurt (born January 2, 1939) is an American former labor union leader.

Born in Marfrance, West Virginia, Hurt joined the United Auto Workers in 1956, soon becoming a shop steward.  In 1972, he began working for the Kroger Bakery in Columbus, Ohio, where he joined the Bakery and Confectionery Workers International Union of America.  He became the union's business agent in 1975, and in 1979 began working full-time for the union.

In 1982, Hurt was appointed as the union's director of organizing, then in 1990, he became its executive vice president.  The following year, he was elected as secretary-treasurer, then in 1992, he took the top office, of the president.  In 1993, he joined the executive council of the AFL-CIO.  From 1997 to 2002, he additionally served as president of the International Union of Food, Agricultural, Hotel, Restaurant, Catering, Tobacco and Allied Workers' Associations.  He retired from his union posts in 2013.

References

1939 births
Living people
American trade union leaders
People from Greenbrier County, West Virginia
Trade unionists from West Virginia
Bakery, Confectionery, Tobacco Workers and Grain Millers' International Union